Halcrow Group Limited was a multinational engineering consultancy company, based in the United Kingdom

Halcrow was one of the UK's largest consultancies, with origins stretching back to 1868. The UK-based consultancy specialised in the provision of planning, design and management services for infrastructure development worldwide. With interests in transportation, water, maritime and property, the company undertook commissions in over 70 countries from a network of more than 90 offices.

In 2011, the company was acquired by US firm CH2M Hill, and in 2013 it was announced that the Halcrow brand would eventually be discontinued. The parent subsequently (2015) rebranded the whole group to CH2M. Two years later, in December 2017, CH2M was acquired by Jacobs Engineering Group.

History 

The company was founded in 1868 by civil engineer Thomas Meik, and originally bore his name, and later those of his sons, Patrick and Charles. It worked extensively on port, maritime and railway projects in the North of England, in Wales and in Scotland, before undertaking its first commissions outside the UK in the 1890s.

20th century
During the first half of the 20th century, William Halcrow (later Sir William) established the firm in other areas, notably tunnelling and hydroelectric schemes.  Their war time work included the design and supervision of the construction of tunnels under London and the Mulberry Harbours used in the D-Day landings.

After the war, Halcrow's attention once again turned to Scotland. For the North of Scotland Hydro-Electric Board, a new generation of hydroelectric schemes to generate power for public consumption was developed. The Glen Affric scheme, started in 1947, was the biggest, but there were similar projects in neighbouring catchments such as Glen Garry and Glen Moriston – the latter including one of the first underground power stations in the UK – and Strathfarrar and Kilmorack.

In Wales, Halcrow's attention turned to water supply projects. The Claerwen dam opened in 1952 and, later, the Clywedog dam, helped create reservoirs to supply the towns and cities of the English West Midlands. Halcrow  also designed railway tunnels at Potters Bar (1955) and the earlier Woodhead Tunnel (1954) and starting work on the new Victoria line underground line beneath central London. Overseas work ranged from roads, bridges and harbours in Ghana, Libya and Mozambique to dams in Venezuela.

The firm had several names during the 20th century, including CS Meik and Buchanan (1920), CS Meik and Halcrow (1923), WT Halcrow and Partners (1941), Sir William Halcrow and Partners (1944), and, finally, Halcrow Group (1998).

21st century

Halcrow's consultancy work included water, transportation, maritime, environment, power and property projects. Its customers included government departments, public sector authorities and utilities, industrial and commercial companies, international funding agencies and financial institutions.

In 2008, the company reported a turnover of £468 million. Projects undertaken outside the UK accounted for 48% of turnover. Owned and managed by its employees and staff shareholders, Halcrow remained an independent firm until late 2011.

CH2M
In September CH2M Hill announced it was set to acquire the company, and on 10 November 2011 CH2M Hill announced that it had completed the acquisition of Halcrow for £124m.

It was subsequently reported that Halcrow was effectively rescued by CH2M Hill, having incurred a pre-tax loss of £71m in its last year of independent trading (to 31 December 2011), on a turnover of £238m, down from £331m in 2010. Accounts lodged with Companies House showed that CH2M Hill's financial backing was crucial to Halcrow’s survival; the US firm agreed a secured loan to the company in December 2012 without which there would have been doubt regarding the firm’s ability to continue as a going concern.

Jacobs Engineering Group
On 2 August 2017 CH2M agreed to be purchased by Jacobs Engineering Group in a US$2.85 billion cash and stock deal. Shareholders approved the deal in December 2017, and the completion of the acquisition was announced on 18 December.

Notable modern projects 

 Second Severn Crossing (UK; completed 1996) - Halcrow, in partnership with French consultant SEEE, designed the crossing on behalf of the Laing-GTM joint venture that won a £330 million contract to design and build the bridge.
 Toronto Pearson International Airport (Toronto, Ontario, Canada; completion c. 2006) - Halcrow Yolles was the structural engineer of record for the passenger terminal facility. It was involved in the early concept design of the Central Processor roof structure in collaboration with Ove Arup and Partners; all remaining concept design, and all final administration services were provided by Halcrow Yolles.
 Clyde Arc Bridge (Glasgow, UK; completed 2006) - Halcrow designed this landmark bridge structure across the River Clyde in central Glasgow. The bridge provides access to the Pacific Quay development.
 One King Street West (Toronto, Ontario, Canada; completed 2007) - Halcrow provided full structural engineering services to this slender 51-storey condominium-hotel linked to the existing 14-storey Toronto Dominion Bank building (c. 1915).
 Sheikh Zayed Mosque (completed 2007) - Halcrow were commissioned in 2001 to fulfil the role of construction supervisor working closely with the contractor, Impregilo of Italy, for the first phase of the project: the structural shell of the building. Following completion of the concrete structure Halcrow acted as the project consultant for the second phase up to completion of the project late in 2007 when the mosque was first opened to worshippers.
 Channel Tunnel Rail Link (High Speed 1) (UK; completed 2007) - Halcrow, as part of the Rail Link Engineering consortium, was responsible for all design and project management services on this project, delivering the £5.8 billion system on time and within budget.
 Abu Dhabi International Airport (Abu Dhabi; completed 2008) - Halcrow was commissioned to carry out planning, design and site supervision for a second runway at Abu Dhabi International Airport.
 Al Garhoud Bridge (Dubai; completed 2008)
 Yas Island Development (Abu Dhabi; completed 2009) - Halcrow acted as the client's appointed lead consultant responsible for the design and construction supervision of the primary infrastructure for this mixed-use 2500ha island development.
 Busan-Geoje Fixed Link (South Korea; completed 2010) - Halcrow TEC JV was appointed Technical Advisers to Daewoo Engineering & Construction Co., Ltd, who were leading the consortium which had been awarded the concession to design, construct and operate this US$1100m transport link.
  Bond Street Station Upgrade (UK; detailed design 2010-12) - Halcrow was part of the design team, along with consultants Atkins appointed by Costain Laing O'Rourke Joint Venture for the upgrading of the existing Bond Street Station in Central London
 Thames Hub (UK; concept 2011) - Halcrow provided technical advice to architects Foster + Partners for its Thames Hub proposal for integrated infrastructure development in the Thames Estuary in the UK.
Tottenham Court Road tube station Upgrade (UK; completed 2017) - multi-disciplinary lead designer for London Underground with architects Acanthus and Hawkins Brown.

See also 
Hafren Power

References

External links 
Halcrow Group Limited

Engineering companies of the United Kingdom